Perrodo is a surname. Notable people with the surname include: 

Carrie Perrodo (born 1950/51), French billionaire heiress and businesswoman, wife of Hubert
François Perrodo (born 1977), French businessman, son of Hubert
Hubert Perrodo (1944-2006), French businessman, polo player and art collector